Flat River Reservoir is a large lake in Kent County, Rhode Island.

See also
List of lakes in Rhode Island

References

Lakes of Rhode Island